Filip Đorđević (born 28 September 1987) is a Serbian professional footballer who plays as a forward.

Đorđević earned 14 caps and scored 4 goals for Serbia from 2012 to 2014.

Club career

Early career
Đorđević began his career at his hometown club Red Star Belgrade, where he spent eight years. He also spent time on loan at Rad. For Red Star, he only appeared in eight league games before moving to France.

Nantes
After being loaned to Ligue 2 side Nantes and helping them achieve promotion to the top-flight Ligue 1 after the 2007–08 season, Nantes agreed to sign him permanently to a four-year contract. In the club's return to Ligue 1, Đorđević featured in 19 league games and scored a total of two goals over the 2008–09 season, and Nantes was demoted to Ligue 2 again. In the subsequent 2009–10 season, he produced nearly identical statistics to the previous season, although Nantes remained in Ligue 2 following its campaign. Finally, Đorđević developed great consistency in the 2010–11 season and appeared in 36 league games, scoring a total of 12 goals and assisting on five occasions. In the 2011–12 season, with Nantes still in Ligue 2, Đorđević played 28 league games and scored six goals as well as providing five assists.

From the 2012–13 season, Đorđević exploded in form and directly contributed to Nantes' promotion at the end of the season. Over 34 league games, he scored 20 goals and was the top scorer of Ligue 2 at the end of the season. On 16 August 2013, Lyon allegedly proposed between €3 and 5 million for Đorđević, although Đorđević and Nantes declined the transfer. In the club's return to Ligue 1, Đorđević scored seven goals in the first 12 games, rivalling Radamel Falcao and Zlatan Ibrahimović for a top place in the Ligue's list of high scorers of the season.

Lazio
On 19 March 2014, Đorđević announced that he would be departing Nantes for Italian Serie A side Lazio. He signed a pre-contract agreement with Lazio after he entered the final six-months of his Nantes contract and joined the team on a free transfer on 1 July 2014. Đorđević's first goals for Lazio came on 29 September 2014, scoring a hat-trick as the club defeated Palermo 4–0, lifting the club into the top half of the Serie A table. He scored again in the club's next match, heading in an Antonio Candreva cross in the 25th minute, in a 3–2 home win over Sassuolo.

Chievo
On 13 June 2018, Chievo announced the signing of Đorđević when his contract expired on 30 June. The contract signed by the Serbian would last three years with an optional extension for a fourth year.

International career
Đorđević was called up for the Serbia national team for 24 November 2007 Euro 2008 Group A qualifier at home against Kazakhstan, but did not make an appearance. Five years after his first call-up, Serbia head coach Siniša Mihajlović selected him for an exhibition match against Chile on 14 November 2012. He scored two minutes after entering the field as a substitute on his debut. After a 2014 World Cup qualifier against Macedonia on 15 October 2013, an image of completely naked Đorđević, accompanied by Nenad Tomović and Aleksandar Kolarov, leaked after a fan sneaked into the dressing room.

Career statistics

Club

International

Scores and results list Serbia's goal tally first, score column indicates score after each Đorđević goal.

Honours
Red Star Belgrade
First League of Serbia and Montenegro: 2005–06
Serbia and Montenegro Cup: 2005–06

Lazio
Supercoppa Italiana: 2017

References

External links

1987 births
Living people
Serbian footballers
Footballers from Belgrade
Association football forwards
Serbia international footballers
Serbia under-21 international footballers
First League of Serbia and Montenegro players
Serbian First League players
Serbian SuperLiga players
Ligue 1 players
Ligue 2 players
Serie A players
Red Star Belgrade footballers
FK Rad players
FC Nantes players
S.S. Lazio players
A.C. ChievoVerona players
Serbian expatriate footballers
Serbian expatriate sportspeople in France
Expatriate footballers in France
Serbian expatriate sportspeople in Italy
Expatriate footballers in Italy